A specific devise is a devise of a certain piece of real estate to a certain person or persons.  It is like a specific legacy, but is limited (by the word "devise") to real estate.

Furthermore, the testator intends for that very particular item and only that item to satisfy the devise. For example, a specific devise would be "My 1959 Gold Rolex."
Wills and trusts